Straight up is a bartending term referring to a chilled drink served in a stemmed glass without ice.

Straight Up may also refer to:

 Straight Up (book), by author, blogger, physicist and climate expert Joseph J. Romm
 Straight Up (Harold Vick album), 1967
 Straight Up (Badfinger album), 1971
 Straight Up (Eric Alexander album), 1992
 Straight Up (Bob James album), 1996
 Straight Up (Jimmy McGriff album), 1998
 "Straight Up" (Paula Abdul song), 1988
 "Straight Up" (Chanté Moore song), 2000
 Straight Up (TV series), a Canadian television series
 Straight Up (1988 film), an anti-drug film

 Straight Up (2019 film), an independent film by James Sweeney
 The Straight Up, a documentary style of photography pioneered by Terry Jones